Andres Loorits (30 November 1869 Holstre Parish (now Viljandi Parish), Kreis Fellin – 4 September 1941 Tallinn) was an Estonian politician. He was a member of the Estonian Constituent Assembly, representing the Estonian Socialist Revolutionary Party. On 9 October 1919, he resigned his position and he was replaced by Aleksander Janson.

References

1869 births
1941 deaths
People from Viljandi Parish
People from Kreis Fellin
Estonian Socialist Revolutionary Party politicians
Members of the Estonian Constituent Assembly